Crooked Fork is a  long 2nd order tributary to Aarons Creek in Granville County, North Carolina.

Course 
Crooked Fork rises about 4 miles southeast of Triple Springs, North Carolina in Person County, and then flows northeast and then turns east to join Aarons Creek about 3 miles south of Virgilina, Virginia.

Watershed 
Crooked Fork drains  of area, receives about 46.1 in/year of precipitation, has a wetness index of 410.19, and is about 51% forested.

See also 
 List of Virginia Rivers

References 

Rivers of North Carolina
Rivers of Granville County, North Carolina
Rivers of Person County, North Carolina
Tributaries of the Roanoke River